Brian Hanscomb is an artist engraver from St Breward, Cornwall.

Brian Hanscomb was born in 1944 at Croxley Green, Hertfordshire. His work is inspired by Quakerism, Zen Buddhism and Bodmin Moor. He served an apprenticeship in letterpress engraving and also trained as a gravure engraver.

His work is in the Government Art Collection, New York Public Library the Science Museum, London and the  National Gallery of Australia. Hanscomb is a Fellow of the Royal Society of Painter-Printmakers.

In 2010 Resurgence magazine described Hanscomb as "Britain's leading copperplate engraver".

Books
 illustrator for Oxley, William, The Mansands Trilogy. Richmond, Surrey: The Keepsake Press, 1988 
 Sun, Sea & Earth Whittington Press, 1989 
 Cornwall; an Interior Vision: copper-engravings & texts Whittington Press, 1992
 The Phoenix: copper-engravings & haiku Whittington Press, 2005

References

External links

brianhanscomb.co.uk

1944 births
Living people
Artists from Cornwall
People from St Breward
English etchers
British printmakers
20th-century English artists
21st-century English artists